Harold Lilly Jr. is a Grammy Award-winning American songwriter from Richmond, Virginia. He has written songs for artists such as Alicia Keys, Beyoncé, Brandy, Zayn Malik, Angie Stone and Luther Vandross.

Awards

|-
|2008
|Harold Lilly
|Heroes and Legends Award
|

List of songs

References

External links 
Interview at Sharvette Mitchell Radio Show

American rhythm and blues singer-songwriters
Year of birth missing (living people)
Living people